Reto Hollenstein (born 22 August 1985) is a Swiss racing cyclist, who currently rides for UCI WorldTeam . He rode in the 2014 Tour de France.

Major results

2010
 8th Giro dell'Appennino
2011
 2nd Ljubljana–Zagreb
 3rd Overall Oberösterreich Rundfahrt
 5th Overall Tour du Gévaudan Languedoc-Roussillon
2013
 National Road Championships
3rd Time trial
4th Road race
 6th Tour de Berne
2014
 7th Tour de Berne
2015
 2nd Time trial, National Road Championships
 7th Overall Tour de l'Eurométropole
2016
 2nd Time trial, National Road Championships
 2nd Overall Tour of Belgium
 9th Overall Arctic Race of Norway
 9th Time trial, UCI Road World Championships
2017
 5th Time trial, National Road Championships
 9th Overall Étoile de Bessèges
2019
 3rd Time trial, National Road Championships

Grand Tour general classification results timeline

References

External links

1985 births
Living people
Swiss male cyclists
People from Frauenfeld
Sportspeople from Thurgau